Zamin-e Taghuk (also Romanized as Zamīn-e Ţāghūk) is a village in Sarduiyeh Rural District, Sarduiyeh District, Jiroft County, Kerman Province, Iran. At the 2006 census, its population was 58, in 15 families.

References 

Populated places in Jiroft County